Columbia Restaurant is a restaurant in Ybor City, Tampa, Florida. It is the oldest continuously operated restaurant in Florida, as well as the oldest Spanish restaurant in the United States and the largest Spanish restaurant in the world. It has 15 dining rooms containing 1,700 seats, totaling 52,000 square feet. Founded in 1903 as Saloon Columbia, it was renamed in 1905 to Columbia Restaurant. The landmark has been owned by the Hernandez-Gonzmart family for five generations and serves Spanish and Cuban cuisine.

In addition to the original location in Ybor City, there are Columbia restaurants in Sarasota (opened in 1959); in St. Augustine (opened in 1983); on Sand Key (1989); and in Celebration, Florida (1997). There are also smaller Columbia Café restaurants located at the Tampa Bay History Center (opened in 2009) and at Tampa International Airport (opened in May 2012).

Wine
The original restaurant's wine list contains more than 1,000 wines with an inventory exceeding 50,000 bottles. The restaurant features several private-label wines created to honor family members. The popular house sangria is mixed table side.

Activities
Several nights a week, the restaurant features dinner show performances of flamenco, one of Spain's traditional dances. 
Columbia Restaurant holds an Annual Community Harvest campaign in September. The chain donates 5% of all guests' lunch and dinner checks, allowing patrons to designate the charitable organizations their choice. As of 2007, the event has generated more than $820,000 to Floridian nonprofits.

The restaurant celebrated "1905 Day" from 1980 to 2013. On that day, a special menu with 1905 prices was in effect from noon to 7 p.m. In 2014, the restaurant announced it would celebrate "1905 Day" in the future on significant anniversaries.

Cesar Gonzmart Memorial Golf Tournament

The annual Cesar Gonzmart Memorial Golf Tournament (CGMGT) began in 1995 by Columbia Restaurant owners Richard and Casey Gonzmart in memory of their father, who died of pancreatic cancer. Proceeds from the event are donated to a local charity or non-profit organization. 

Columbia Restaurant, through funds raised during the 2001 CGMGT, and the Sant 'Yago Education Foundation gave $5,000 to support the American Heart Association's American Heart Heroes Week project, an initiative that provides camp experiences for children with cardiovascular disease. The 2003 CGMGT raised over $55,000 for Moffitt Cancer & Research Institute, the University of South Florida Athletic Association, and a scholarship for the USF Latino Scholarship Program.

Awards and recognitions 
In 2009, the Columbia Restaurant was recognized as one of the 25 iconic restaurants of the Tampa-St.Petersburg area by the St. Petersburg Times. It was also listed in Nation's Restaurant News in the "Top 50 All-American icon category." The 2022 Michelin Guide for Florida rated Columbia as "Recommended".

See also
 List of Spanish restaurants

References

External links
 
Travel Watch review: Ybor City’s World Famous Columbia Restaurant
University of South Florida Libraries: Columbia Restaurant Oral History Project 
University of South Florida Libraries: Columbia Restaurant/Gonzmart Family Collections, 1903-

Companies based in Tampa, Florida
Cuban-American culture in Tampa, Florida
Cuban restaurants in the United States
History of Tampa, Florida
Landmarks in Tampa, Florida
Restaurants established in 1905
Restaurants in Tampa, Florida
Spanish-American culture in Tampa, Florida
Spanish restaurants in the United States
1905 establishments in Florida